The Record was a weekly newspaper published in Melbourne, Victoria, from 1869 to at least 1954, serving Port Melbourne, Albert Park, Middle Park, and Garden City.

History

The Record was founded by theatrical printer William Marshall (c. 1845 – 12 June 1900), at Emerald Hill, Victoria after the demise of four other South Melbourne newspapers, Mason & Hill's Emerald Hill Weekly, which first appeared on 28 April 1856, which lasted a year, and its successor R. Mills's Emerald Hill and Sandridge Post, edited by David Blair, and its  bitter rival, Morris & Rees's South Melbourne Standard, of which Rev. W. Potter FRGS became editor, then shortly became defunct and was followed by Ferguson and Moore's Courier, edited by James Ward, which also proved unprofitable.
In 1878 Marshall purchased the business and printery of The Lorgnette, a theatre programme guide, and continued running both businesses.
Under Marshall it had been renamed The Emerald Hill and Sandridge Record or The Record and Emerald Hill and Sandridge Advertiser, then in 1880 Marshall purchased the Melbourne firm of Charlwood & Son, and in 1881 sold the business to a local consortium, who appointed the aforesaid Rev. Potter as manager.
In 1882 a handsome building, architect S. W. Smith, was erected for the business, which was then purchased by Potter. In 1893 he became insolvent after disposing of his assets through a complex "round robin" of children and his future wife. He died a year later in a buggy accident.

Publication
In 1881 it was published on Saturdays at the office of "The Record" Newspaper Company, 28 Dorcas Street East, Emerald Hill, and consisted of four pages, price 1d. (one penny).

In 1954 it was published on Saturdays at the office of C. J. Meehan, of Wynward Street, South Melbourne, and consisted of eight pages, price 3d. (three pence).

Digitization
The National Library of Australia has digitized photographic copies of most issues from No.656 of 1 April 1881 to Vol. LXXXV No.50 of 22 December 1954, and may be examined via Trove.

References 

Defunct newspapers published in Melbourne
Publications established in 1869

1869 establishments in Australia